Litoria chrisdahli is a species of frog in the subfamily Pelodryadinae. It is endemic to Papua New Guinea.

References

Litoria
Amphibians of Papua New Guinea
Amphibians described in 2007